At the 1960 Winter Olympics six cross-country skiing events were contested. The competitions were held from Friday, 19 February, to Saturday, 27 February 1960. All the races took place at McKinney Creek Stadium, Tahoma, California, United States.

Medal summary

Medal table

Men's events

Women's events

References

External links

1960 Squaw Valley Official Olympic Report
1960 Olympic Nordic Events

 
1960 Winter Olympics
1960 Winter Olympics events
Olympics
Sports in Tahoma, California
Cross-country skiing competitions in the United States